The Floralies Internationales de Montréal was the 8th international horticultural exposition recognized by the Bureau of International Expositions. It was held during the spring and summer of 1980, from May 17 to September 1. The Expo was split in two sequential exhibitions, starting with an indoor event in the former Montreal Olympic Velodrome and later on different gardens on Notre Dame Island, the site of the Expo 67. 17 countries were represented at the indoor exhibition and the Velodrome was converted to the Montreal Biodome afterwards. The indoor exhibition opened on May 17 and closed May 29. The gardens at the outdoor part opened on May 31. 12 countries showed their gardens to the public during the summer until September 1.

Locations
 Interior flower show: Olympic Velodrome (May 17, 1980 to May 29, 1980)
 Outdoor flower show: Notre Dame Island (May 31, 1980 to September 1, 1980)

Participating countries and square footage

References

External links
 Official website of the BIE

World's fairs in Montreal
1980 in Canada
International horticultural exhibitions
Exhibitions in Montreal
1980 in Quebec
1980s in Montreal
Garden festivals in Canada